Pseudochromis olivaceus, the olive dottyback, is a species of ray-finned fish from the Western Indian Ocean, which is a member of the family Pseudochromidae.

References

olivaceus
Taxa named by Eduard Rüppell
Fish described in 1835